Song (Old Chinese: *) was a state during the Zhou dynasty of ancient China, with its capital at Shangqiu. The state was founded soon after King Wu of Zhou conquered the Shang dynasty to establish the Zhou dynasty in 1046 BC. It was conquered by the State of Qi in 286 BC, during the Warring States period. Confucius was a descendant of a Song nobleman who moved to the State of Lu.

Origin 
King Zhou of Shang, Di Xin was the younger brother of Zi Qi (who was said in legends to have ruled Gija Joseon in the 11th century BCE) and Zi Yan (later rulers of Zhou's vassal state Song), father of Wu Geng.

As a result, for a time Shang became a vassal state of Zhou, with the Shang heir Wu Geng allowed to continue ancestor worship at Yin.

However, after King Wu's death, Wu Geng fomented a rebellion with an alliance of eastern states, and was killed by the Duke of Zhou. Another Shang royal family descendant, Weizi, was granted land at Shangqiu ("the hill of Shang"), where the capital of the new state of Song was built.

A sign of its descent from the Shang is that the state of Song in its early period followed the succession principle of agnatic seniority, rather than agnatic primogeniture like the Zhou.

History 
In 701 BC, a political marriage between Lady Yong of Song and Duke Zhuang of Zheng (as well as the capture of Zhai Zhong, a leading warrior) empowered Song to manipulate the administration of Zheng.

In 651 BC, Duke Huan of Song died, leaving the district to be ruled by Duke Xiang, who reigned from 651 to 637BC. He was considered a Hegemon by some, but was unable to maintain that role. He eventually fell to the troops of Chu.

In 355BC, Dai Ticheng, a distant relative of the ruling royal line and once a minister of Duke Huan II, managed to usurp the throne. In 328BC, Dai Yan, a younger brother of Ticheng, took the throne and declared himself to be King Kang of Song, with Ticheng murdered or exiled. The king was ambitious and had succeeded in beating troops from Chu, Wei and Qi and annexing Teng. However, the kingdom was finally annexed by Qi in 286BC, with troops from Chu and Wei serving on behalf of Qi. Qin, which had been an ally of Song, refused to intervene for strategic and diplomatic reasons after being convinced by Su Dai from Wei. Su's predictions were proven correct and Qin benefited from the downfall of its former ally.

The philosopher Mozi references this state in the chapter "Obvious Existence of Ghosts", in which he mentions a number of Spring and Autumn Annals, including those of the Zhou, Yan, and Qi. The Spring and Autumn Annals of Song has not survived.

Rulers 
Unless otherwise indicated, the ruler is the son of his predecessor.

 Weizi 微子 (Qi 啟), brother of the last king of Shang, Di Xin
 Weizhong 微仲 (Yan 衍), younger brother of the above
 Ji, Duke of Song 宋公稽
 Duke Ding 宋丁公 (Shen 申)
 Duke Min I 宋湣公 (Gong 共), ancestor of Confucius
 Duke Yang 宋煬公 (Xi 熙), younger brother of the above
 Duke Li 宋厲公 (Fusi 鮒祀), son of Duke Min I
 Duke Xi 宋僖公 (Ju 舉), 859–831
 Duke Hui 宋惠公 (Jian 覵), 830–800
 Duke Ai 宋哀公, 799
 Duke Dai 宋戴公, 799–766
 Duke Wu 宋武公 (Sikong 司空), 765–748
 Duke Xuan 宋宣公 (Li 力), 747–729
 Duke Mu 宋穆公 (He 和), 728–720, younger brother of the above
 Duke Shang 宋殤公 (Yuyi 與夷), 719–711
 Duke Zhuang 宋莊公 (Feng 馮), 710–692
 Duke Min II 宋閔公 (Jie 捷), 691–682
 You, Duke of Song 宋公游, assassinated less than 3 months after accession.
 Duke Huan I 宋桓公 (Yuyue 御說), 681–651, younger brother of Duke Min II
 Duke Xiang 宋襄公 (Zifu 茲父), 650–637
 Duke Cheng 宋成公 (Wangchen 王臣), 636–620
 Yu, Duke of Song 宋公禦, younger brother of the above, assassinated less than one month after accession.
 Duke Zhao I 宋昭公 (Chujiu 杵臼), 619–611, son of Duke Cheng
 Duke Wen 宋文公 (Bao 鮑), 610–589, younger brother of the above
 Duke Gong 宋共公 (Xia 瑕), 588–576
 Duke Ping 宋平公 (Cheng 成), 575–532
 Duke Yuan 宋元公 (Zuo 佐), 531–517
 Duke Jing 宋景公 (Touman 頭曼), 516–451
 Duke Zhao II 宋昭公 (De 得), 450–404, great-grandson of Duke Yuan; possibly 468–404, making him one of the longest-reigning monarchs.
 Duke Dao 宋悼公 (Gouyou 購由), 403–396
 Duke Xiu 宋休公 (Tian 田), 395–373
 Duke Huan II 宋桓公 (Bibing 辟兵), 372–370
 Lord Ticheng of Song 宋剔成君, 369–329, descendant of the 11th duke, Dai
 Yan, King of Song 宋王偃, King Kang 宋康王, 328–286, younger brother of the above

Rulers family tree

Descendants 

Confucius was a descendant of the Dukes of Song, as are his descendants, the Dukes of Yansheng.

The title of Duke of Song and "Duke Who Continues and Honours the Yin" (殷紹嘉公) were bestowed upon Kong An (孔安 (東漢)) by the Eastern Han dynasty because he was part of the Shang dynasty's legacy. This branch of the Kong family is a separate branch from the line that held the title of Marquis of Fengsheng village and later Duke Yansheng.

Song in astronomy 
Song is represented by the star Eta Ophiuchi in the asterism Left Wall, Heavenly Market enclosure (see Chinese constellation).

See also 
Marquis of Extended Grace

References 

 
Ancient Chinese states
11th-century BC establishments in China
3rd-century BC disestablishments
1st-millennium BC disestablishments in China
Former monarchies